This list includes the appointment date and performance record of the 16 current National Rugby League head coaches.

Wayne Bennett, the head coach of the South Sydney Rabbitohs, has coached in the NRL since 1987, making him the longest serving coach in the league.

Appointments that do not take immediate effect begin on 1 November.

Coaches

Statistics are correct to the end of the 2021 NRL season

See also

List of current NRL Women's coaches
List of NSWRL/ARL/SL/NRL premiership captains and coaches

Notes

References

NRL
Coaches